Phinneys Cove  is a community in the Canadian province of Nova Scotia, located in Annapolis County.

References

Communities in Annapolis County, Nova Scotia